Jeepney Jackpot: Pera o Para! (English: Jeepney Jackpot: Money or Leave)  is a Philippine game show broadcast on TV5. It aired from January 7 to April 5, 2013

Main hosts
 Mr. Fu
 Valeen Montenegro
 Saida Diola
 Andres

See also
List of programs broadcast by TV5

References

External links
 

Philippine game shows
TV5 (Philippine TV network) original programming
2013 Philippine television series debuts
2013 Philippine television series endings
Filipino-language television shows